Harm's Way or In Harm's Way may refer to:

Films
 Harm's Way (2007), a thriller film starring Kathleen Quinlan
 In Harm's Way (1965), a film based on the Bassett's novel
 In Harm's Way (2017 film), a Chinese war drama also known as The Chinese Widow
 Into Harm's Way (2012), an American documentary about the West Point class of 1967

Literature
Harm's Way (novel), a 1962 war novel by James Bassett
 Harm's Way (1993), a sci-fi/fantasy novel by Colin Greenland
In Harm's Way: The Sinking of the U.S.S. Indianapolis and the Extraordinary Story of Its Survivors (2003), a non-fiction book by Doug Stanton

Music
 Harm's Way (band), an American hardcore band that formed in 2006
 "Harms Way", a song by Anthrax from their album Volume 8: The Threat Is Real (1998)
 "In Harm's Way", a song by Converge from their album When Forever Comes Crashing (1998)
 "In Harm's Way", a song from the album Rehab by Quiet Riot (2006)
 "In Harm's Way", a 2017 single by Amanda Palmer

Television
 "Harm's Way" (Angel), a 2004 episode of the television series Angel
 In Harm's Way (TV series), a 2008 reality television series

Other entertainment and media
 Harms Way, a 2010 video game
 In Harm's Way (video game), a 1988 video game
 "In Harm's Way", a 2004 episode of the fan-created Internet series Star Trek: New Voyages

See also